The Network for Teaching Entrepreneurship (formerly National Foundation for Teaching Entrepreneurship), also referred to as NFTE (pronounced Nifty), is an international nonprofit organization providing entrepreneurship training and educational programs to middle and high school students, college students, and adults. Much of NFTE's work focuses specifically on young people in underserved communities.

Through the organization's patented entrepreneurship education, NFTE helps young people build entrepreneurial creativity and skills. Since 1987, NFTE has reached more than a million young people, and currently has programs in 25 states across the U.S. and 14 countries around the globe.

NFTE provides highly academic programs and has worked with established universities such as Columbia University and University of Pennsylvania to develop programming that inspires learners to recognize opportunity and plan for successful futures by pursuing educational opportunities and by encouraging starting their own businesses.

History

Founded in 1987 by business executive and entrepreneur Steve Mariotti, while he was a public high school teacher in New York City’s South Bronx, NFTE was started up as a program to prevent high school dropout and improve academic performance among at-risk urban students. Combining his business background with his desire to teach at-risk students, Mariotti developed his concept based on the theory that low-income youth when given an opportunity in entrepreneurship, can employ their innate "street smarts" to develop "academic smarts" and "business smarts".

The organization's supporters include leading global companies, successful entrepreneurs and business leaders, family foundations, and respected philanthropic organizations.

Programs

NFTE programs instruct in entrepreneurship using experiential curriculum, developed through associations with major universities, as well as NFTE personnel's own experiences in teaching. There multiple versions designed for middle school, high school, and young adult students, with graduated levels of reading and complexity.

The curriculum may be used in a semester-long or year-long entrepreneurship course work, with the programs are offered in a variety of settings, including public schools, after-school programs at community-based organizations, and summer business camps. Business plan competitions and regional competitions organized by NFTE and program partners, lead to national NFTE competitions each year. Winning students receive a trip to the annual awards dinner in New York City and a grant to apply toward their business or college expenses.

NFTE runs intensive summer programs called BizCamps for students aged 13 to 18. The camp model includes field trips, guest speakers and full day, five-days-a-week course work, providing a solid understanding of business. At the end of the camp, students compete for cash awards to fund their businesses or college.

Anecdotal Results
Tim Perez, 18, of San Leandro, CA founded his own custom website development business, T Perez Designs. “NFTE empowered me to start my own business and educated me on how to run it, how to build a business plan, marketing, finances, you name it,” Perez says. “It literally built my fundamental understanding of business. Without NFTE, I would still be trying to find myself. With NFTE, I’m able to buy my own clothes, help pay my college tuition, and support myself when I get to college. Not a lot of teenagers, especially from my neighborhood, can say that.” 

Another NFTE graduate Amber Liggett, founder of Amber’s Amazing Animal Balloons, was named the 2011 Global Young Entrepreneur of the Year, an award is sponsored by the Goldman Sachs Foundation. She was also named Black Enterprise’s Teenpreneur of the Year and was featured on PBS’s award-winning television show, Biz kid$.

2013 graduates Jesus Fernandez and Toheeb Okenla of South Holland, IL, turned to their shared interest and greatest passion: soccer. From there T&J Soccer was born. Toheeb came to the United States from Nigeria with his family at age 8 and recently lost his father. Jesus came from Michoacán, Mexico in search of better opportunities.

References 

Entrepreneurship organizations